The SPARCstation 20 or SS20 (code-named Kodiak) is a discontinued Sun Microsystems workstation introduced in March 1994 based on the SuperSPARC or hyperSPARC CPU.  It is one of the last models in the SPARCstation family of Sun "pizza box" computers, which was superseded by the UltraSPARC design in 1995.

Specifications

Release Price

CPU support

The SPARCstation 20 has dual 50 MHz MBus ports that allow it to use faster CPUs than the SPARCstation 10.  With two dual-CPU modules and updated firmware, the SPARCstation 20 supports a maximum of four CPUs.  The fastest CPU produced for the SPARCstation 20 is the 200 MHz Ross hyperSPARC.

The PROM in the SPARCstation 20 determines CPU compatibility.  Version 2.25 is the last BootPROM release from Sun, and 2.25R from Ross.

Memory
The SPARCstation 20 has eight 200-pin DSIMM slots, and supports a maximum of 512 MB of memory with 64 MB modules.  Memory modules for the SPARCstation 20 are compatible with the SPARCstation 10, Sun Ultra 1, and some other computers in the sun4m and sun4u families, but they are physically incompatible with the SIMM slots found in PC computers.

Two of the eight SIMM slots are wider than the others and can be used with non-memory peripherals like caching NVSIMM and video VSIMM cards.

Disk drives 

The SPARCstation 20 has two internal SCA bays, an external SCSI connector, and two bays for CD-ROM or floppy drives.  Earlier revisions of the SPARCstation 20 case contain a CD-ROM and floppy bays that are slightly shorter than a standard 3.5" bay and regular devices intended for PC compatible computers do not usually fit. Later revisions of the SPARCstation 20 and SPARCstation 5 have a narrower slot for the floppy drive so a more-standard CD-ROM can fit.

The SCSI host controller is integrated with the motherboard.  The SPARCstation 20 does not support IDE devices.

A limitation in all releases of the OpenBoot PROM for the SPARCstation 20 prevents it from booting from a point on a disk past the 2 gigabyte mark.

Network
The SPARCstation 20 has one integrated AMD Lance 10BASE-T Ethernet interface, along with a custom 26-pin AUI interface.  Additional Ethernet interfaces can be added with an SBus card.

Graphics
The SPARCstation 20 has a built-in 13W3 video socket driven by an optional SX (CG14) framebuffer built onto a VSIMM. If two VSIMMs are installed, an auxiliary video board must also be installed to provide a second 13W3 video socket. Alternatively, SBus cards can be used, including the 8-bit color Turbo GX (CG6), 24-bit color ZX (Leo) and others.

Sound
The SPARCstation 20 has integrated sound with four standard 3.5 mm audio jacks for headphones, microphone, line in, and line out.

NVRAM
The SPARCstation 20 uses a battery-backed NVRAM module to hold data about the system, such as the host ID (serial number) and MAC address. If the battery on the chip dies, then the NVRAM module must be replaced (or modified to use an external battery), and the NVRAM must be reprogrammed with a MAC address and host ID. Optionally a M48T08-100PC1 can be used.

Operating systems
 SunOS 4.1.3_U1B onwards
 Solaris 2.3 to 9
 Linux (Debian, Gentoo, SuSE 7.0 - 7.3, probably others)
 NetBSD
 OpenBSD (up to 5.9)
 MirOS BSD
 NeXTSTEP 3.3 and OPENSTEP 4.x (SuperSPARC CPU modules only)

Notable uses
 117 SPARCstation 20 Model HS11 units, 87 with two 100 MHz hyperSPARC processors and 30 with four 100 MHz hyperSPARC processors, plus a single octo-processor SPARCserver 1000 were used to render Toy Story.

Related computers
 SPARCstation 5
 SPARCstation 10

See also
 SPARCstation

External links
FAQABOSS for old Sun computers
The Rough Guide to MBus Modules (A list of CPU modules for the SPARCstation 20.)

Vendor documentation 
SPARCstation 20 System Configuration Guide
SPARCstation 20 Service Manual
Sun4m Boot PROM Revisions
Sun NVSIMM installation guide

References 

Sun workstations
SPARC microprocessor products